, also known as Tatuya Ishii (born September 22, 1959) is a Japanese singer-songwriter, artist, and industrial designer from Ibaraki Prefecture.

Biography 
In 1985, he debuted as vocalist in the band . In 1992, their single  won the Japanese record first prize. After Kome Kome Club's breakup in 1997, he began a solo career. His first solo single was released in 1997. To date, he has released 20 singles and 12 albums in his solo career.
He has written and produced numerous songs for special events in Japan.

In addition to his musical career, Ishii has executed a number of different projects, including acting as the spatial coordinator for HEP Five, coordination producer for the "Suzuka 8-Hour Endurance Races," the producer of "The Forest Fairy's Ball" for Expo 2005, and recently the producer of "GROUND ANGEL in Hiroshima," an event commemorating the 60th anniversary of the Hiroshima bombing. He has held private art exhibitions such as "Daydream Art Gallery" in 1997, and in 1999, "EXPO ISHII 1999 SHOW TEN." Ishii also acts as a radio personality for FM Yokohama on his weekly radio show YOKOHAMI. As an industrial designer, he has managed many designs for items like PCs and accessories, tableware, furniture, and often produces the costumes and stages for his concerts. He is also a writer, and has written numerous books. He had a monthly magazine publication that ran for two years called .

Alongside his many artistic talents, Ishii has also produced two films, ACRI ~The Legend of Homo-Aquarellius (1996) and Kappa (1994). In addition to producing ACRI, Ishii teamed up with artists Char and Ariga Nobuo to produce a soundtrack for the movie, under the band name ACRI.

Ishii's song River also was used as the second ending to the anime Mobile Suit Gundam Seed.

Discography 
Studio albums

H (1998)
Deep (1999)
Guy (2000)
Roman (2002)
Theater (2002)
Nipops (2003)
Hane (2003)
Nylon King (2004)
Sketch (2005)
Hidokei (2007)
Tatuya Ishii's Acrism (2007)
Tatuya Ishii's Kappa Gensō (2007)

Pendulum (2008)
Chandelier (2009)
Moon & Earth (2011)
Heart Voices (2012)
Love (2012)
White Canvas (2013)
Shine (2014)
Stone (2015)
Black Diamond (2016)
Diamond Memories (2017)
Love Diamonds (2019)
Touchable (2020)

Television cameo 
Tatsuya Ishii guest starred in the Canadian science fiction TV series Sanctuary; he briefly appears as the head of the Tokyo Sanctuary at the beginning of the Season 2 finale "Kali", which aired on SyFy on January 15, 2010.

External links 
  Tatsuya Ishii's official website
  Tatsuya Ishii's Sony Music Japan website
  Kome Kome Club official website (Sony Music Corporation)

1959 births
Living people
Japanese male singer-songwriters
Japanese singer-songwriters
Japanese male pop singers
Sony Music Entertainment Japan artists